Sisay Leudetmounsone (born 8 March 1959) is a Laotian politician and member of the Lao People's Revolutionary Party (LPRP). She currently serves as Head of the LPRP Central Committee Organisation Commission, and is a member of the 11th Central Committee, 11th Politburo and the 11th Secretariat.

From 2016 to 2021 she served as 4th-ranked Vice President of the National Assembly of Laos and Vice President of the National Assembly's Standing Committee.

She's been a member of the Central Committee since the 8th term in 2006.

Additionally, she served as President of the Lao Women's Union from 2004 to 2020 when Sisavath Keobounphanh was elected in her place.

References

Bibliography 
Articles:
 

Books:
 
 

Living people
Members of the 8th Central Committee of the Lao People's Revolutionary Party
Members of the 9th Central Committee of the Lao People's Revolutionary Party
Members of the 10th Central Committee of the Lao People's Revolutionary Party
Members of the 11th Central Committee of the Lao People's Revolutionary Party
Members of the 11th Politburo of the Lao People's Revolutionary Party
Members of the 11th Secretariat of the Lao People's Revolutionary Party
Lao People's Revolutionary Party politicians
Place of birth missing (living people)
1959 births